Presidential elections were held in Cape Verde on 17 October 2021. The result was a victory for José Maria Neves of the opposition African Party for the Independence of Cape Verde (PAICV), who received 51.8% of the vote.

Background
The outgoing president Jorge Carlos Fonseca was first elected after the 2011 election, and was re-elected in 2016 after winning 74% of the popular vote.

Electoral system
The president was elected using the two-round system by registered voters residing in the country and abroad. Eligible candidates must be citizens "of Cape Verdean origin, who hold no other nationality"; over 35 years of age on the date of candidacy; and have resided in the country for three years prior to that date. The application to register as a candidate must be presented to the Constitutional Court for approval, and requires the signatures of at least 1,000 and at most 4,000 electors.

On 27 July 2021 incumbent president Jorge Carlos Fonseca issued a decree confirming that the election would be held on 17 October, with a second round provisionally scheduled for 31 October. Fonseca himself was ineligible to run due to term limits. The constitution requires candidates to register 60 days prior to the election, thus setting the deadline at 17 August.

Candidates
The two dominant parties, the PAICV and the Movement for Democracy (MpD), both nominated former prime ministers as their candidates. The PAICV nominated José Maria Neves, and the MpD nominated Carlos Veiga. Veiga ran for the presidency in 2001 (when he lost by just 12 votes out of 153,406 cast in the second round) and 2006 (losing by a margin of less than 2%).

Besides the two main competitors, five more candidates appeared on the ballot.

Campaign
The campaign period began on 30 September and ended on 15 October. Frontrunners Veiga and Neves both pledged to stabilize the country due to the ongoing COVID-19 crisis, which heavily destabilized the economy.

Results
PAICV candidate José Maria Neves was elected in the first round with over 51% of the vote. This was the first time the PAICV won a presidential election since 2006, when Pedro Pires was re-elected president for a second term.

Aftermath
Late on election day, Veiga conceded defeat, stating: "The will of the people was heard and the will of the people was granted. I want to offer my congratulations to Jose Maria on his election as president of the republic." Neves celebrated his win and said he wanted to be the "president of all Cape Verdeans", adding that it was "a great responsibility to preside over the Cape Verdean nation in these difficult times, and I receive this victory with the great humility."

References

Cape Verde
Presidential election
Cape Verde
Presidential elections in Cape Verde